Ragas is a genus of flies belonging to the family Empididae.

The species of this genus are found in Europe and Northern America.

Species:
 Ragas alpina Sinclair & Saigusa, 2001 
 Ragas baltica Sinclair & Hoffeins, 2013

References

Empididae
Brachycera genera